Ōbara Station is a HRT station on Astram Line, located in 5815-11, Tomo, Numata-cho, Asaminami-ku, Hiroshima.

Platforms

Connections
█ Astram Line
●Tomo — ●Ōbara — ●Tomo-chūō

Around station
Tomo Post Office
Numata Driving School

History
Opened on August 20, 1994.

See also
Astram Line
Hiroshima Rapid Transit

References

Astram Line stations